Santa Vittoria may refer to:

 Santa Vittoria in Matenano, municipality  in the Province of Fermo in the central Italian region Marche
 Santa Vittoria d'Alba, municipality in the Province of Cuneo in the Italian region Piedmont
 Battle of Santa Vittoria, battle  in the Italian region of Emilia-Romagna on 26 July 1702 during the War of the Spanish Succession
 Nuragic sanctuary of Santa Vittoria, an archaeological site in Serri, Sardinia, Italy
 The Secret of Santa Vittoria, a 1969 film distributed by United Artists

See also 
 Vittoria (disambiguation)
 Saint Victoria (disambiguation)
 Santa Maria della Vittoria (disambiguation)